The Ciampi Cabinet, led by the former Governor of the Bank of Italy Carlo Azeglio Ciampi, was the 50th cabinet of the Italian Republic and the second and final cabinet of the XI Legislature. It held office from 29 April 1993 until 11 May 1994, a total of 378 days, or 1 year and 12 days.

It was the first government of the Italian Republic led by a non-Parliamentarian and the last government led by Christian Democrats.

Former communists joined the government for the first time since 1947, but they left the government after a few days.

Indeed, on 4 May 1993, a few days later the settlement of the government, the Democratic Party of the Left and the Federation of the Greens withdrew their ministers, in protest against the failed authorization to proceed against Bettino Craxi by the Chamber of Deputies. The PDS ministers were replaced with independents.

The cabinet obtained the confidence in the Chamber of Deputies on 7 May 1993, with 309 votes in favour, 60 against and 182 abstentions, and in the Senate on 12 May 1993, with 162 votes in favour, 36 against and 50 abstentions. The Democratic Party of the Left, the Northern League, the Italian Republican Party and the Greens refrained from voting for confidence in the government.

The government resigned on 13 January 1994.

Party breakdown
The government was initially composed of the members of the following parties:
Independents: Prime Minister, 8 ministers
Christian Democracy (DC): 8 ministers and 20 undersecretaries
Italian Socialist Party (PSI): 5 ministers and 10 undersecretaries
Italian Liberal Party (PLI): 1 minister and 3 undersecretaries
Italian Democratic Socialist Party (PSDI): 1 minister and 3 undersecretaries
Italian Republican Party (PRI): 1 undersecretary

Until 4 May 1993, the government was also composed of members of the following parties:
Democratic Party of the Left (PDS): 3 ministers
Federation of the Greens (FdV): 1 minister

Composition

References

Italian governments
1993 establishments in Italy
1994 disestablishments in Italy
Cabinets established in 1993
Cabinets disestablished in 1994